Modèle 1935 pistol may designate:

 Pistolet automatique modèle 1935A (Alsace), developed by Charles Petter
 Pistolet automatique modèle 1935S (Saint-Étienne)